Lisa M. Diamond is an American psychologist and feminist. She is a professor of developmental psychology, health psychology and gender studies at the University of Utah. Her research focuses on sexual orientation development, sexual identity, and bonding.

She is best known for her 2008 book, Sexual Fluidity: Understanding Women's Love and Desire. In this book, she discusses the fluidity of female sexuality, based on her study of 100 non-heterosexual women over a period of 10 years. She concluded that the term bisexual did not truly express the versatile nature of many of her subjects. Therefore, she calls "for an expanded understanding of same-sex sexuality".

Early life
Diamond became interested in feminism after Betty Friedan gave a talk at her high school. She studied feminist theory at the University of Chicago and joined the board of the Chicago National Organization for Women. During this time, she came out as a lesbian and decided to pursue research into same-sex sexuality instead of activism.

In 1993, she received her B.A. in psychology from the University of Chicago. She then started graduate work with Ritch Savin-Williams at Cornell University, where she earned her M.A. in 1996, and her Ph.D. in 1999, both in Human Development.

Work
At the University of Utah, Diamond was an assistant professor from 1999 to 2005, and an associate professor from 2005 to 2012. She became a professor of psychology and gender studies in 2012. She serves on the editorial boards of Developmental Psychology, Archives of Sexual Behavior, and various other journals. Her research focuses on same-sex sexuality, adolescent females, and human bonding.

In her studies of sexual fluidity, she has found that some women report variability in their sexual orientation identity. Diamond is clear that sexual orientation is not chosen, but that identity can shift non-voluntarily for some women. The sexually fluid women she studied did not "experience those changes as willful", and some even resist them. Diamond says that conversion therapy cannot remove same-sex attraction.

Describing herself as a feminist scientist, Diamond says "there are a lot of scientists who just cling to the scientific method and believe they are totally objective and I think they are full of bunk. But, I have met a lot of feminists who say there is not a way to collect data without being oppressive, that data has no meaning, the world is socially constructed and I think that is bunk too." Diamond has also researched attachment theory as the basis for love and sexual orientation, and the association between relationships and psychobiological health.

Diamond was awarded the Outstanding Achievement Award by the APA Committee on Lesbian, Gay, Bisexual, and Transgender Concerns in 2011; the Distinguished Book Award by the International Association of Relationship Research (IARR) in 2010; and the Distinguished Book Award for her book Sexual Fluidity by the American Psychological Association, Division 44 in 2009. Sexual Fluidity was also a finalist for the Lambda Literary Award for Bisexual Literature.

Publications

Diamond, L. M., Hicks, A. M., and Otter-Henderson, K. D. (2008). Every time you go away: Changes in affect, behavior, and physiology associated with travel-related separations from romantic partners. Journal of Personality and Social Psychology, 95, 385–403.
Diamond, L. M., & Dickenson, J. (2012). The neuroimaging of love and desire: Review and future directions. Clinical Neuropsychiatry, 9, 39–46.
Diamond, L. M. (2008). Female bisexuality from adolescence to adulthood: Results from a 10-year longitudinal study. Developmental Psychology, 44, 5–14.
Diamond, L.M., Fagundes, C. P., & Cribbet, M. R. (2012). Individual differences in adolescent sympathetic and parasympathetic functioning moderate associations between family environment and psychosocial adjustment. Developmental Psychology.
Diamond, L. M. & Wallen, K. (2011). Sexual-minority women's sexual motivation around the time of ovulation. Archives of Sexual Behavior, 40, 237–246.
Diamond, L. M., Hicks, A. M., & Otter-Henderson, K. D. (2011). Individual differences in vagal regulation moderate associations between daily affect and daily couple interactions. Personality and Social Psychology Bulletin, 37, 731–744.
Diamond, L. M. (2012). The desire disorder in research on sexual orientation in women: Contributions of dynamical systems theory. Archives of Sexual Behavior, 41, 73–83.
Diamond, L.M. (2013). Concepts of female sexual orientation. In C. Patterson & A. R. D'Augelli (Eds.), The psychology of sexual orientation (pp. 3–17). New York: Cambridge University Press.
Diamond, L.M. (2013). Sexuality in relationships. In J. Simpson & L. Campell (Eds.), Handbook of close relationships (pp. 589–614). New York: Oxford University Press.
Diamond, L.M. (2013). Sexual-minority, gender-nonconforming, and transgender youths. In D. Bromberg & W. O. Donohue (Eds.) Handbook of child and adolescent sexuality: Developmental and forensic psychology (pp. 275–300). Oxford: Elsevier Press.
Diamond, L.M. (2013). Links and distinctions between love and desire. In C. Hazan and M. Campa (Eds.), Human bonding: The science of affectional ties (pp. 226–250). New York: Guilford.
Diamond, L.M. (2014). The biobehavioral legacy of early attachment relationships for adult physiological, emotional, and interpersonal functioning. In V. Zayas & C. Hazan (Eds.), Bases of adult attachment: Linking brain, mind, and behavior (pp. 79–105). New York: Springer.
Farr, R.H., Diamond, L.M., & Boker, S.M. (2014). Female same-sex sexuality from a dynamical systems perspective: Sexual desire, motivation, and behavior. Archives of Sexual Behavior, 43, 1477–1490.
Diamond, L.M. (2014). Sexuality and same-sex sexuality in relationships. In J. Simpson & J. Davidio (Eds.), Handbook of personality and social psychology (Vol. 3, pp. 523–553). Washington, DC: APA.
Diamond, L.M. (2016). Female sexual orientation. In A. Goldberg (Ed.), The Sage encyclopedia of LGBTQ lives in context (pp. 551–556). Thousand Oaks, CA: Sage.
Mansfield, C.D., & Diamond, L.M. (2016). Does stress-related growth really matter for adolescents' day-to-day adaptive functioning? Journal of Early Adolescence.
Bailey, J.M., Vasey, P., Diamond, L.M., Breedlove, M., Vilain, E., & Epprecht, M. (2016). Sexual orientation, controversy, and science. Psychological Science in the Public Interest, 17, 45–101.
Diamond, L.M., & Rosky, C. (2016). Scrutinizing "immutability": Research on sexual orientation and its role in legal advoacacy for the rights of sexual minorities rights? Journal of Sex Research, 53, 363–391.
Diamond, L.M. (2016). Three critical questions for future research on lesbian relationships. Journal of Lesbian Studies, 21, 1–14.
Diamond, L.M. (2016). Sexual fluidity in males and females. Current Sexual Health Reports, 8, 249–256.
Diamond, L.M., Dickenson, J., & Blair, K. (2017). Stability of sexual attractions across different time scales: The roles of bisexuality and gender. Archives of Sexual Behavior, 46, 193–204.
Diamond, L.M. (2018). Contemporary theory in the study of intimacy, desire, gender, and sexuality. In N. Dess, J. Marecek, D. Best, & L. Bell (Eds.), Gender, sex, and sexualities: Psychological perspectives (pp. 271–294). New York: Oxford University Press.
Spivey, L.A., Huebner, D.M., & Diamond, L.M. (2018). Parent responses to childhood gender nonconformity: Effects of parent and child characteristics. Journal of Sexual Orientation and Gender Diversity, 5, 360–370.
Diamond, L.M. (2018). The dynamic expression of sexual-minority and gender-minority experience during childhood and adolescence. In S. Lamb & D. Gilbert (Eds.), The Cambridge handbook of sexuality: Childhood and adolescence (pp. 92–110). New York: Cambridge University Press.

References

External links
Diamond at University of Utah (scientific articles to download)
Interview (hour-long) on Radio West focusing on Diamond's research on sexual fluidity, 2014
List of Diamond's publications, The University of Utah

American women psychologists
21st-century American psychologists
American feminists
American LGBT scientists
Psychology writers on LGBT topics
Cornell University alumni
University of Chicago alumni
University of Utah faculty
American lesbian writers
Living people
Year of birth missing (living people)
Lesbian academics
Lesbian scientists
American women academics
21st-century American women writers